The Djibouti women's national football team is the representative women's association football team of Djibouti. Its governing body is the Djiboutian Football Federation (FDF) and it competes as a member of the Confederation of African Football (CAF).

The national team's first activity was in 2006, when they played a friendly match against Kenya in which they lost 0–7. Djibouti is currently unranked in the FIFA Women's World Rankings.

Record per opponent
Key

The following table shows Djibouti' all-time official international record per opponent:

Results

2006

2019

2021

2022

See also
 Djibouti national football team results

References

External links
 Djibouti results on The Roon Ba
 Djibouti results on Globalsports
 Djibouti results on worldfootball.net

2010s in Djibouti
2020s in Djibouti
Women's national association football team results